Conus cedonulli is a species of sea snail, a marine gastropod mollusk in the family Conidae, the cone snails and their allies.

Like all species within the genus Conus, these snails are predatory and venomous. They are capable of "stinging" humans, therefore live ones should be handled carefully or not at all.

Being a very varied species-complex, there has been much confusion in the course of years about which species and subspecies to assign to the Conus cedonulli-complex, hence the number of synonyms named.  In 1985, D.L.N. Vink proposed assigning the following species to the Conus cedonulli-complex along with Conus cedonulli :
 Conus aurantius Hwass in Bruguière, 1792
 Conus insularis  Gmelin, 1791 : considered by Vink to be a synonym of Conus aurantius Hwass in Bruguière, 1792
 Conus mappa  sensu Lightfoot, 1786
 Conus sanctaemarthae spec. nov. : now synonym of Conus mappa sensu Lightfoot, 1786

The following subspecies of Conus cedonulli were recognized by the World Register of Marine Species:
 Conus cedonulli dominicanus Hwass in Bruguière, 1792: synonym of Conus dominicanus Hwass in Bruguière, 1792
 Conus cedonulli insularis Gmelin, 1791: synonym of Conus cedonulli Linnaeus, 1767

Description
The color of the species in this complex is white to purplish grey although specimens from St. Vincent are very often dark-mahogany-brown, with some rare examples being 'black' or near-black. The shell is crossed by streaks that are alternately light and dark. Between these streaks, yellow, brown or dark dots occur. The operculum is small compared to the aperture and is only one seventh its size. The soft body of the animal is dark red.The size of an adult shell varies between 38 mm and 78 mm.

Distribution
Locus typicus: (restricted by Vink & vonCosel) St. Vincent, Lesser Antilles.

This species occurs in the Caribbean Sea from Colombia to Trinidad, 
along the Lesser Antilles and along the Bahamas.

Offshore West coast Barbados, 
the species has been dredged at depths around 150 metres.  
This would seem to be the species' bathymetric maximum, 
since at other locations this species is usually found at much shallower depths.

Gallery
Below are several color forms:

References

 Vink, D. L. N. and von Cosel, R. 1985. The Conus cedonulli complex: historical review, taxonomy and biological observations. Revue Suisse de Zoologie 92(3):525–603, 9 figs, 12 pls.
 Filmer R.M. (2001). A Catalogue of Nomenclature and Taxonomy in the Living Conidae 1758 – 1998. Backhuys Publishers, Leiden. 388pp
 Tucker J.K. (2009). Recent cone species database. September 4, 2009 Edition
 Puillandre N., Duda T.F., Meyer C., Olivera B.M. & Bouchet P. (2015). One, four or 100 genera? A new classification of the cone snails. Journal of Molluscan Studies. 81: 1–23

External links
 The Conus Biodiversity website
 Conus cedonulli History
 
 Cone Shells – Knights of the Sea

cedonulli
Gastropods described in 1758
Taxa named by Carl Linnaeus